The Big Five was a series of biological weapons developed by the United States Army Chemical Corps' Special Operations Division (SOD) at Fort Detrick Biological Warfare Laboratory (BWL) for use by special forces.  These weapons were developed in the 1950s and 1960s, and were eventually destroyed when the United States unilaterally ended its offensive biological warfare program.

The weapons were -

M1 Biodart (E1) A 7.62mm rifle cartridge with a sabot surrounding a flechette with exterior grooves filled with either botulinum toxin A (XR), saxitoxin (TZ), or possibly a combination of the two.  There were 4,450 filled and 5,315 unfilled M1s in the arsenal at the time of its destruction.

M2 Separable Bullet (E2)
A 7.62mm rifle cartridge with a hollow metal bullet containing dry-type botulinum toxin A (XR), or a simulant.  The bullet would release a puff of aerosol on impact.  Anthrax (TR) was another possible fill.  There were 71,696 filled and 14,046 unfilled M2s in the arsenal at the time of its destruction.

M4 Disseminator
A small gas expulsion device for disseminating a dry-type agent, such as tularemia (SR).  There were 21,150 filled and 34,568 unfilled M4s in the arsenal at the time of its destruction.

M5 Depositor (E44)
A metal can that would expel a quantity of dry-type from the side of a road to work as an anti-convoy device from secondary aerosols (kick-up).  Though intended for anthrax (TR) these were only filled with simulants.  There were 90 filled and 2,604 unfilled M5s in the arsenal at the time of its destruction.
  
M32 Disperser
Using a pressurized gas bottle, regulator, heater, and timer, the M32 was a man-pack weapon for pre-emplacement upwind of a target.  The agent reservoir was an interchangeable compartment that held either 7 liters of wet-type or 2.75 kilograms of dry-type agent.  It was intended for use with tularemia (SR) or simulants.  There were 168 filled and 348 unfilled M32s in the arsenal at the time of its destruction.

Biological weapons
Weapons of the United States